Bob Stratton Bald, often referred to as Stratton Bald, is a grassy bald in the Unicoi Mountains located in the Joyce Kilmer-Slickrock Wilderness in the Nantahala National Forest. Its elevation is approximately 5,360 feet.

Description 
The bald is named for Robert "Bob" Stratton (1825-1864), whose family lived on the bald.

The bald is subdivided into two smaller balds: Stratton Bald (elevation 5,360 feet), and Bob Bald (elevation 5,280 feet). Together, they make up Bob Stratton Bald. It is a typical Appalachian bald, with thick grass and few trees and is a popular hiking destination for backpackers. It is accessible via the Stratton Bald Trail (FS Trail 54), which connects to the Benton MacKaye Trail and the Cherohala Skyway.

See also 
Unicoi Mountains
Appalachian balds
Nantahala National Forest
Joyce Kilmer Memorial Forest
Hooper Bald

References 

Nantahala National Forest
Mountains of North Carolina
Appalachian balds
Unicoi Mountains
Protected areas of Graham County, North Carolina
Landforms of Graham County, North Carolina